The Peter Clegg House, at 8 South 100 East in Tooele, Utah, was built in 1903.  It was listed on the National Register of Historic Places in 2019.

It is a two-story "Central-Block-with-Projecting-Bays"-type single family house, with Victorian Eclectic style.

It was deemed significant in part for its association with the life of Peter Clegg.

References

National Register of Historic Places in Tooele County, Utah
Houses completed in 1903